Mokosh is a Slavic goddess mentioned in the Primary Chronicle, protector of women's work and women's destiny. She watches over spinning and weaving, shearing of sheep, and protects women in childbirth. Mokosh is the Mother Goddess.

Mokoš was the only female deity whose idol was erected by Vladimir the Great in his Kiev sanctuary along with statues of other major gods (Perun, Hors, Dažbog, Stribog, and Simargl).

Etymology and origin
Mokosh probably means moisture. According to Max Vasmer, her name is derived from the same root as Slavic words  mokry, 'wet', and moknut(i), 'get wet', or 'to dive deeply into something'. She may have originated among the northern Finnic peoples of the Vogul, who worship the divinity Moksha.

Myth

Family relations
According to ancient Slav belief, this deity had some connection to thunder god Perun.

Her consorts are probably both the god of thunder Perun and his opponent Veles. In saying, the former Katičić follows Ivanov and Toporov (1983) without further corroborating their claim. Katičić also points to the possibility that as goddess Vela she is the consort of Veles, and might even be interpreted as another form of the polymorph god Veles himself. Mokosh is also the mother of the twin siblings Jarilo and Morana.

A key myth in Slavic mythology is the divine battle between Perun and Veles. Some authors including Ivanov and Toporov believe the abduction of Mokosh causes the struggle.

Later worship
As late as the 19th century, she was worshipped as a force of fertility and the ruler of death. Worshipers prayed to Mokosh-stones or breast-shaped boulders that held power over the land and its people.

In Eastern Europe, Mokosh is still popular as a powerful life-giving force and protector of women. Villages are named after her. She shows up in embroidery, represented as a woman with uplifted hands and flanked by two plow horses. She has been claimed to be shown with male sexual organs, as the deity in charge of male potency, however no visual proof has been provided.

Christianization

During the Christianization of Kievan Rus', she was replaced by the cult of the Virgin Mary and St. Paraskevia.

Archeological evidence
Archeological evidence of Mokosh dates back to the 7th century BC.

Boris Rybakov, in his 1987 work Paganism of Ancient Rus, conjectures that Mokosh is represented on one of the sides of the Zbruch Idol.

Legacy

In toponymy 
Scholarship considers that traces of Mokosh exist in the toponymy of Slavic countries:
 Slovenia: a village name Makoše (in the vicinity of Ribnica, historically known as Makoša or Makoš); river name Mokoš (Prekmurje region);
 Croatia: village Makoše near Dubrovnik; suburb areas of Nova and Stara Mokošica;
 Czech Republic: village and river name Mokošín (in Pardubice Region, Eastern Bohemia); 
 Bosnia and Herzegovina: hill name Mukušina (near Ravno village); hill name Mukoša (South of Mostar);
 Polabian: place name Muuks/Mukus;
 Poland: Mokosz, Mokosza, Mokoszyn, Mokosznica;
 Russia: Old Russian village Mokošina;
 Belarus: marsh named Mókšava balóta.

Other uses
Mokosh is also a manufacturer of natural cosmetics.

See also

 Kikimora
 Perperuna and Dodola

References

Notes

Crafts goddesses
Earth goddesses
Slavic goddesses
Textiles in folklore
Harvest goddesses